Stockwell (1849–1870) was a British Thoroughbred racehorse and a Leading sire in Great Britain & Ireland seven times; he was second on the sires' list a further four times during a 14-year period.

Breeding
Stockwell was foaled in Stockwell, England, at the stud farm of William Theobald.  His sire, The Baron was a successful racehorse and sire.  His dam Pocahontas was a roarer – a trait never demonstrated in Stockwell himself, but passed to several of his descendants. Pocahontas later also produced the successful sires, Rataplan and King Tom.

The chestnut was not a particularly pretty horse; he was described by one turf writer as "the very incarnation of ugliness," possessing a plain head with a slight Roman nose and hindquarters like a carthorse.  He had good feet, strong legs and was very powerful, however, giving him the ability to carry high weights.  Although a poor mover he was very fast; his speed made up for his terrible temperament, which was considered "a bit savage". Stockwell stood over 16 hands high with a stripe on his nose, a sock on his off (right) hind leg,  another mid-cannon sock on his near (left) hind leg and Bend-Or spots on his coat.

Although the colt was thought to be "over-large," Brownlow Cecil, 2nd Marquess of Exeter purchased the yearling for 180 sovereigns, with the contingency that he would pay £500 more if Stockwell won The Derby.

Race record

Two-year-old
Stockwell began his racing career during the fall of his two-year-old year.  He ran twice, finishing second by a head in the Prendergast Stakes for two-year-olds and fourth in the six-furlong Criterion Stakes.

Three-year-old
 Newmarket Craven: second by a neck
 2,000 Guineas Stakes: won at 10–1 odds
 Newmarket Stakes: won, defeating Maidstone, Father Thames (winner of the Newmarket Handicap), and three others
 Goodwood: won, defeating Harbinger (by Touchstone) by a half-length
 Racing Stakes Handicap: won by two lengths, carrying top weight
 Great Yorkshire Stakes: won by a length, defeating Longbow, Hex and nine others
 Doncaster St. Leger Stakes: won by 10 lengths, defeating Harbinger, Daniel O'Rourke, Songstress (Oaks winner), and two others
 Foal Stakes: won in a walkover
 Grand Duke Michael Stakes: won by three lengths "in a canter", beating Muscovite (the Cesarewitch Handicap winner)
 Newmarket St. Leger: won by two lengths

Stockwell's three-year-old year was his greatest, and provided him with the reputation he would need to secure mares.  His first race was the Craven Stakes at Newmarket Racecourse, where he finished second in a three-horse field by a neck. He won his next race, the 2,000 Guineas Stakes, at 10–1 odds before winning the Newmarket Stakes.  He finished eighth in The Derby, although some believe that the colt had a tooth abscess lanced just prior to the race which would have affected his running. However, he finished his three-year-old season spectacularly with eight successive wins (including two walkovers).

Four-year-old
 Emperor of Russia's Plate (Ascot Gold Cup): 2nd

Stockwell ran once as a four-year-old, finishing second by a head in the Emperor of Russia's Plate (Ascot Gold Cup). He then went "amiss," and was sidelined for the rest of the 1853 season and most of the 1854 season.

Five-year-old
 The Whip: won

As a five-year-old he ran once in the Whip, beating Kingston (who broke down during the race), by 30 lengths.  He was then retired to stud.

Stud record
Stockwell was sent to Exeter's stud farm at Newmarket. Known as "The Emperor of Stallions" in his own time, Stockwell was a leading sire throughout the 1860s, Champion Sire in England seven times (from 1860 to 1862 and 1864 to 1867) and finishing second several times (1863, 1868, 1872, 1873).

His progeny won a total of 1,147 races, earning £362,451. 209 of his 412 foals were winners.  Twelve of his offspring won 17 classic races, and 13 placed in one or more classic races.  His sons were also successful sires, including Doncaster, sire of Bend Or.  Many of his daughters were also good producers.  Perhaps one of the best-known descendants of Stockwell is Man o' War.

Lord Exeter sent Stockwell to his stud at Burghley.  The stallion was sold at Tattersall's after his first season (for 3,000 guineas) to Albert Denison, 1st Baron Londesborough.  Stockwell was then sent to Kirkby Farm (later renamed Stockwell Stud), where he stood for a fee of 30 guineas.  It was here that he sired his first eight classic winners and headed the top of the sire list.  However, the death of the Baron in 1860 led to a sale of all stock; Stockwell was purchased for 4,500 guineas by Richard C. Naylor of Cheshire, and sent to Rawcliffe Stud for his 1861 and 1862 seasons to stand for a fee of 40 guineas.  He was fully booked to 50 mares, and led the sire list for two more years.

After the 1862 season, Stockwell was moved to Naylor's stud farm at Hooton Park, where he lived for the final eight years of his life in relative luxury.  He went on 15-mile walks in good weather, and lived in a barn "big enough for him to run about in". By the end of his stud career his fee had risen to 300 guineas, and most of his breedings were to Naylor's own mares. Stockwell stood at stud from 1855 until his death, at the age of 21, due to an accident in the breeding shed.

Notable progeny

Pedigree

See also
Doncaster (horse)
Pocahontas (horse)
The Baron (horse)

References

1849 racehorse births
1871 racehorse deaths
Racehorses bred in the United Kingdom
Racehorses trained in the United Kingdom
Thoroughbred family 3-n
2000 Guineas winners
St Leger winners